Michael Brennan OAM (born 15 October 1975 in Toowoomba, Queensland) is a field hockey midfielder from Australia, who was a member of the team that won gold at the 2004 Summer Olympics in Athens. Four years earlier, when Sydney hosted the Summer Games, he finished in third spot with The Kookaburras , as the men's national team is called. Michael Brennan has since gone on to become a multiple Group 1 winning horse trainer.

References
 Profile on Hockey Australia

External links

 https://smh.com.au/sport/racing/michael-brennan-going-for-gold-with-im-victorious-in-interdominion-final-20140301-33snn.html

Living people
1975 births
Australian male field hockey players
Male field hockey midfielders
Olympic field hockey players of Australia
Olympic gold medalists for Australia
Olympic bronze medalists for Australia
1998 Men's Hockey World Cup players
Field hockey players at the 2000 Summer Olympics
Field hockey players at the 2004 Summer Olympics
Recipients of the Medal of the Order of Australia
People educated at Trinity College, Perth
Sportspeople from Toowoomba
Olympic medalists in field hockey
Medalists at the 2004 Summer Olympics
Medalists at the 2000 Summer Olympics
Commonwealth Games medallists in field hockey
Commonwealth Games gold medallists for Australia
Field hockey players at the 1998 Commonwealth Games
Sportsmen from Queensland
Field hockey people from Queensland
Medallists at the 1998 Commonwealth Games